is a Japanese media franchise centered on a series of fantasy-themed action role-playing video games that started with the game Monster Hunter for the PlayStation 2, released in 2004. Titles have been released across a variety of platforms, including personal computers, home consoles, portable consoles, and mobile devices. The series is developed and published by Capcom.

The games are primarily action role-playing games. The player takes the role of a Hunter, slaying or trapping large monsters across various landscapes as part of quests given to them by locals, with some quests involving the gathering of a certain item or items, which may put the Hunter at risk of facing various monsters. As part of its core gameplay loop, players use loot gained from slaying monsters, gathering resources, and quest rewards to craft improved weapons, armor, and other items that allow them to face more powerful monsters. All main series titles feature multiplayer (usually up to four players cooperatively), but can also be played single player.

As of December 31, 2022, the game series has sold 90 million units worldwide, and is Capcom's second best-selling series following Resident Evil. The early games in the series principally sold well in Japan and other Asian countries, popularized by the series' use of ad hoc multiplayer features on portable consoles. Monster Hunter has been critically well-received in Western markets, but had generally languished in sales, in part due to the game's steep learning curve. However, with  Monster Hunter: World (2018), Capcom aimed to attract a global audience using the power of advanced home gaming consoles and computers and released the title simultaneously worldwide. World became the best-selling Monster Hunter game within three days of its release, and became Capcom's single best-selling video game of all time with 21 million sales as of July 5, 2022, including more than 70% outside of Japan.

In addition to games, the franchise has an anime based on the spinoff game Monster Hunter Diary: Poka Poka Airou Village, Monster Hunter Stories: Ride On based on the spinoff title Monster Hunter Stories, a manga Monster Hunter Orage, and a book Monster Hunter Episode. A feature film directed by Paul W. S. Anderson was released on December 3, 2020.

An animated film, subtitled Legends of the Guild, was released on August 12, 2021 on Netflix.

Setting
Monster Hunter takes place in a shared low fantasy setting, where the human-like species have a pre-industrial level of technology such as steam power, but continue to study the ruins of a long-past advanced civilization. In the setting's less populated regions, monsters roam the landscape and threaten small villages or research bases that have been established to study the ruins and these monsters. Players take the role of a Hunter that serves to help protect the villages and bases from these monsters, typically aiding in researching these.

Gameplay
The core feature of Monster Hunter is its compulsion loop. Unlike traditional computer role-playing games, a player's Hunter does not grow and has no intrinsic statistics or attributes whatsoever. Rather, the Hunter's abilities are instead defined by the specific weapons and armor selected. The player can equip weapons, armor, and items most beneficial towards completing a given mission, and if successful, the Hunter is awarded in both in-game money ("zenny") and loot representing parts from the monster. These parts, along with other resources collected while on missions or through mission rewards, can be used to forge or upgrade new weapons and armor which then can be used in against more powerful monsters and tackle more difficult missions, completing the compulsion loop. Harder missions are typically restricted by a hunter's rank, which cumulatively increases as the player completes specific missions designated by the quest giver. Mission rewards are often generated randomly, often requiring the player to grind the same monster repeatedly to get the right parts. Weapons and armor have intrinsic bonuses or penalties towards certain types of elemental or physical damages, and may provide special skills which can be fine-tuned through the mix-and-matching of equipment pieces.

The games feature a variety of different weapon classes, ranging from swords, hammers, and bows, with the most recent titles (Generations, World, and Rise) having a total of fourteen classes. Each weapon class has a unique set of combat maneuvers and reflect a number of different play styles based on speed of attack, damage strength, range and the application of buffs and debuffs to monsters and allies. Monster Hunter games use an "animation priority" combat, committing the player to a move until the animation is completed and leaving them potentially vulnerable to a monster's attack. Further, players are encouraged to watch their Hunter's health and stamina. Losing all health will force a retreat to a base camp, and after three such retreats, the mission is deemed a failure. Performing most combat actions consumes stamina, which recovers in a short amount of time; once exhausted of stamina, the Hunter becomes vulnerable as they pause to catch their breath. Monsters and other environmental hazards can also inflict blights and other negative status effects that impair combat abilities. Combat is centered around watching for a monster's tells prior to an attack to be able to dodge it and/or make a counterattack, and looking for openings to unleash strings of attack combos, depending on the Hunter's current weapon. Unlike most other action games, Monster Hunter fights have been compared to a series of boss fights.

Nearly all Monster Hunter games have a single-player mode; in these, the Hunter is often accompanied by a Felyne or Palico, a sentient cat-like creature that provides support and limited offensive abilities in combat. Most Monster Hunter games released with support for four-player cooperative online modes, allowing the group to hunt down stronger versions of monsters, though this support has since been disabled in older games. The games typically have a main quest line, frequently called "Low Rank" or "Village Quests", which can take up to fifty hours to complete. Once completed, the game opens up with new "High Rank" or "Gathering Hall" quests, featuring stronger versions of monsters they have previously faced, as well as new monsters not yet seen and unique variants of these foes, all of which provide better components for more powerful weapons and armor sets, providing hundreds of hours of potential gameplay following the main quest. Most, if not all titles have a third rank of difficulty ("G Rank" or "Master Rank"), released after the base game. These add more monsters, locations, weapons and armour sets to the game.

History 

The first Monster Hunter game was one of three titles Capcom had developed to take advantage of the processing power and online capabilities of the PlayStation 2, which according to Ryozo Tsujimoto, who has been the series' producer since Monster Hunter Freedom 2, had begun to match arcade games in capabilities; the other two such titles were Auto Modellista and Resident Evil Outbreak. Tsujimoto considered Monster Hunter to be the culmination of the work of these other two titles once it was released. He also felt that the game was intended for such cooperative play so that players of any skill level, working with others, could feel accomplished in taking down giant creatures. Monster Hunter proved a success, selling over 1 million copies, principally in Japan. Enhanced versions of the early games, adding more difficult monsters and end-game quests, were released with a "G" affixed to the end (such as Monster Hunter G for the first such game); for those titles that were released in Western regions, these were often, though not always, affixed with the Ultimate moniker. A second team worked to develop a series for the PlayStation Portable. These games often had a more lighthearted tone and expanded upon the palicoe system. In Japan, these games were released under the "Portable" title, while in the west they were released under the "Freedom" title. Even after these naming conventions were abandoned, this established the general tradition of one team releasing games for home consoles and a separate team releasing a portable game a few years later.

The series took off explosively in Japan with Monster Hunter G and Monster Hunter Portable/Freedom on the PlayStation Portable and even more so once its sequels Monster Hunter Dos, Monster Hunter Portable 2nd/Freedom 2 and Monster Hunter Portable 2nd G/Freedom Unite were released which supported up to four players. Handheld systems are generally more popular in Japan and due to the country's high population density, it was easy to find players to hunt cooperatively with, making it a phenomenon there. James Miekle, writing for PC Gamer, had worked for Q Entertainment and lived in Japan during the release of Monster Hunter Portable 3rd, which was the best selling PlayStation Portable game of all time and described how even during work, impromptu Monster Hunter sessions would break out between employees and there was extensive marketing of Monster Hunter branded consumer goods.

While Monster Hunter had been successful in Japan, its popularity in Western markets (primarily North America and Europe) languished. In contrast to the Japanese culture, Western markets favored home consoles and computers during the mid-2000s and because of a thinner population density, most players relied on Internet-based gaming rather than local ad hoc networking. The series also struggled with a difficult learning curve that had made the games off-putting in Western markets.

The series had little popularity in the West until the release of Monster Hunter 3 Ultimate on the Nintendo 3DS, a console that had gained a sizable foothold in Western markets. While Monster Hunters popularity in the West was still to a niche group, Capcom saw the potential for more growth there and took steps to better localize the next few titles to make the series more attractive; Monster Hunter 4 was the first game in the series to break one million sales in Western markets. Capcom recognized there was still room for further growth of the series there; in an October 2016 interview, Capcom chairman Kenzo Tsujimoto said they were looking towards increasing the popularity of the games in the Western markets, recognizing that gaming consoles like the PlayStation 4 and Xbox One have dominance in these regions over handhelds. Monster Hunter: World, the series's first major entry targeting home consoles and computers, was developed to be more alluring for Western markets without trying to make the game simpler. A number of changes in gameplay were made that took advantage of the consoles' new technology; notably, while the prior games had split each hunting area into different zones as necessitated by limits of the console hardware, Worlds used seamless zones and several changes to gameplay were made to account for this. World became the series' best selling game, achieving more than 21 million units sold by 2022 and making the Monster Hunter series Capcom's best-selling series following Resident Evil.

With the success of the changes to the formula defined by World, Capcom decided to continue this approach with the series' next major title, Monster Hunter Rise for the Nintendo Switch.

Games
Below is a list of games in the Monster Hunter main series. Each generation has a number of entries that are derivative of the original release. While the first four main titles were numbered, the subsequent installments, starting with World, use a keyword instead of a number to reflect a central concept for that game.

Main series

Spinoffs

Reception
Since the series debuted, Monster Hunter has sold 90 million units across all titles by December 31, 2022.  It is Capcom's second highest-selling series, following Resident Evil. 

Total worldwide sales for Monster Hunter games exceeding 1 million units, through September 30, 2022. are listed below:

Other media

Video games
A female Monster Hunter appeared as a playable character via downloadable content in Marvel vs. Capcom: Infinite. The game also features a stage called "Valkanda", which combines Val Habar from the fourth installment with Wakanda from the Marvel universe. Rathalos and Tigrex, two of the series' flagship monsters, make a cameo appearance in Metal Gear Solid: Peace Walker on hunting missions. Rathalos appeared as a special event monster to fight in Final Fantasy XIV as part of a cross-promotional event with Monster Hunter: World, with the Behemoth appearing in World in return. In 2018, Rathalos also appeared as a boss character and a summonable Assist Trophy in the crossover fighting game, Super Smash Bros. Ultimate, while several Mii Fighter costumes based on Monster Hunter were added post-launch in March 2021 a few weeks ahead of Rise release. In 2020, Rathalos made a limited appearance in Cygames' mobile title Dragalia Lost as part of an in-game event.

The Monster Hunter games themselves have offered crossover events with other Capcom and third-party properties, allowing users during the event to earn armor and weapons inspired by the other property. For example, Monster Hunter World has had promotional events that include Resident Evil, Mega Man, Assassin's Creed, and The Witcher series.

Anime

A series of anime shorts titled MonHun Nikki Girigiri Airū-mura Airū Kiki Ippatsu (:ja:モンハン日記 ぎりぎりアイルー村) was broadcast beginning August 10, 2010. A sequel, MonHun Nikki Girigiri Airū-mura G, was produced. An anime series based on the franchise premiered on October 2, 2016.

Manga and comics
A manga titled Monster Hunter Orage was published jointly by Kodansha and Capcom in April 2008. The author of the manga is Hiro Mashima. There are four volumes total with the last volume published on May 4, 2009. An English release of Monster Hunter Orage first took place on June 28, 2011. Elements from Monster Hunter were later included in the Worlds Unite comic crossover from Archie Comics, which featured several other Capcom and Sega franchises making guest appearances in the previously running Sonic the Hedgehog and Mega Man comic lines.

Card game
A trading card game titled Monster Hunter Hunting Card was released in October 2008 with periodic updates planned.

Film

A film based on the series has been in conception since 2012 by director Paul W. S. Anderson. The film was formally announced by Capcom in October 2018, with production starting that month with Impact Pictures and Constantin Film and was released in the United Kingdom and China on December 4, 2020. The film is based on a United Nations task force falling into an alternate dimension where Hunters fight off monsters and the force joins the Hunters to prevent monsters from returning through the portal to Earth. The film starred Milla Jovovich, Ron Perlman, T.I. Harris, Diego Boneta and Tony Jaa.

Animated film

In 2018, Capcom and Pure Imagination Studios announced that they are working on a 3D animated film Monster Hunter: Legends of the Guild. The special was written by Joshua Fine, and features a fledgling hunter taking down an Elder Dragon. Originally slated for a 2019 release, the film was released on August 12, 2021, on Netflix.

See also
 List of Japanese role-playing game franchises
 God Eater, a video game franchise with a similar gameplay mechanic
 Lord of Arcana 
 Toukiden  
 Freedom Wars
 Horizon Zero Dawn
 Soul Sacrifice
 Wild Hearts 
 Dauntless, a free-to-play game with a similar gameplay mechanic but requires an Online Connection to play

Notes

References

External links
 
 

 
Capcom franchises
Action role-playing video games by series
Video games about dragons
Fantasy video games
Video games adapted into comics
Video games adapted into films
Video games adapted into television shows
Video game franchises
Video game franchises introduced in 2004